Paul Mose (born 15 May 1949) is a Kenyan long-distance runner. He competed in the marathon at the 1968 Summer Olympics.

References

1949 births
Living people
Athletes (track and field) at the 1968 Summer Olympics
Athletes (track and field) at the 1972 Summer Olympics
Athletes (track and field) at the 1974 British Commonwealth Games
Kenyan male long-distance runners
Kenyan male marathon runners
Olympic athletes of Kenya
African Games silver medalists for Kenya
African Games medalists in athletics (track and field)
African Games bronze medalists for Kenya
Athletes (track and field) at the 1973 All-Africa Games
Commonwealth Games competitors for Kenya